Kira Valeryevna Stepanova (born 12 November 1993) is a Russian sprint canoeist. She competed in the women's K-2 500 metres event at the 2016 Summer Olympics.

References

External links
 

1993 births
Living people
Russian female canoeists
Canoeists at the 2015 European Games
Olympic canoeists of Russia
Canoeists at the 2016 Summer Olympics
Canoeists at the 2020 Summer Olympics
People from Engels, Saratov Oblast
Canoeists at the 2019 European Games
European Games medalists in canoeing
European Games bronze medalists for Russia
ICF Canoe Sprint World Championships medalists in kayak
Sportspeople from Saratov Oblast